Frederick Henry Paul Methuen, 2nd Baron Methuen (23 February 1818 – 26 September 1891), was a British peer and Liberal politician.

Methuen was the son of Paul Methuen, 1st Baron Methuen, and his wife Jane Dorothea (née St John-Mildmay). He succeeded his father in the barony in 1849 and served as a Lord-in-waiting (government whip in the House of Lords) under Lord Palmerston and later Lord Russell between 1859 and 1866 and under William Ewart Gladstone from 1868 to 1874, 1880 to 1885, and in 1886. He was also an Aide-de-Camp to Queen Victoria.

He played once for the Marylebone Cricket Club in June 1843.

Lord Methuen married Anna Horatia Caroline Sandford, only daughter of Reverend John Sanford, vicar of Nynehead, Somerset, and his wife Elizabeth Georgiana Morgan (formerly Baroness Cloncurry, having been divorced from her first husband) in 1844. He died in September 1891, aged 73, and was succeeded in the barony by his eldest son Paul Methuen. Lady Methuen died in 1899.

Lord Methuen served under Lord Leigh as the first Deputy Grand Master of the Grand Lodge of Mark Master Masons, from 1856 to 1857.

Arms

Notes

References
Kidd, Charles, Williamson, David (editors). Debrett's Peerage and Baronetage (1990 edition). New York: St Martin's Press, 1990, 

1818 births
1891 deaths
Liberal Party (UK) Lords-in-Waiting
Marylebone Cricket Club cricketers
English cricketers
Presidents of the Marylebone Cricket Club
Frederick
Frederick
Younger sons of barons